Lapa do Salitre, also Lapa do Convento, literally "cave of saltpeter" (BA-0166) is a limestone cave measuring 5,670 meters long, located near the municipality of Campo Formoso, in the State of Bahia, Brazil.

See also
List of caves in Brazil

References

External links
 Base de Dados do Ministerio do Meio Hambiente Governo Federal - ICMBIO Official Website

Caves of Bahia
Wild caves